Torodora babeana is a moth in the family Lecithoceridae described by Kyu-Tek Park in 2007. It is found in northern Vietnam.

The wingspan is 19–20 mm. The ground color of the forewings is shiny golden brown, often with large yellowish triangular or elongate patch near two thirds of the inner margin. The hindwings are pale yellowish brown.

Etymology
The specific name is derived from the geographic locality of four of the paratypes, Ba Bể, Vietnam.

References

Torodora
Moths of Asia
Moths described in 2007